The ICC World Cup Qualifier (previously called the ICC Trophy and officially known as the ICC Men's Cricket World Cup Qualifier) is a One-Day International (ODI) cricket tournament that serves as the culmination of the Cricket World Cup qualification process for the Cricket World Cup. It is usually played in the year before the World Cup. Although the tournament historically has not maintained a regular or identifiable format, a final qualification event awarding berths in the event proper has been a regular feature of the ICC Cricket World Cup since 1979. 

At every World Cup, a set number of teams qualify automatically, with other teams having to qualify through a process that has the World Cup Qualifier as its culmination. Until 2015, automatic qualification was granted to all full members of the International Cricket Council (ICC). However, for the 2019 Cricket World Cup, only the top eight teams in the ICC ODI Championship were given automatic qualification, meaning ICC full members played in the Qualifier for the first time. The other places in the Qualifier are given to the best teams in the World Cricket League, which has been in operation since 2007. 

From the 2023 World Cup onwards, only the host nation(s) will qualify automatically. All countries will participate in a series of leagues to determine qualification.

The number of World Cup berths determined by the Qualifier currently stands at two; in the past, it has ranged from one (1982–1990) to five (2005).

In September 2018, the ICC confirmed that all matches in the ICC World Cup Qualifier will have ODI status, regardless if a team does not have ODI status prior to the start of an individual tournament event.

Results

Champions and Runner-up

Teams' performances
Legend
Teams that qualified for the World Cup due to their performance in a particular edition are underlined.
AQ – Team received automatic qualification to the World Cup, so did not participate in the Qualifier
 – Champions
 – Runners-up
 – Third place
 – Losing semi-finalist (no third-place play-off)
R1, R2 – First round, second round (no further play-offs)
PO – Team lost in an inter-round play-off (2001 only; ranked 9th–10th)
× – Qualified, but withdrew

Tournament records

Team records
Highest totals
 One Day Internationals: West Indies 357-4 (50 overs) v United Arab Emirates, Harare, 2018
 List A: Zimbabwe 380-6 (50 overs) v Nepal, Bulawayo, 2018
 Minor: Papua New Guinea 455-9 (60 overs) v Gibraltar, Cannock, 1986
 Overall: Papua New Guinea 455-9 (60 overs) v Gibraltar, Cannock, 1986

Lowest totals 
 One Day Internationals: Hong Kong 91 all out (38.2 overs) v Scotland, Bulawayo, 2018
 List A: Oman 41 all out (15.1 overs) v Papua New Guinea, Drummond, 2005
 Minor: East and Central Africa 26 all out (15.1 overs) v Netherlands, Kuala Lumpur, 1997
 Overall: East and Central Africa 26 all out (15.1 overs) v Netherlands, Kuala Lumpur, 1997

Individual records
Most runs in an innings: 172 (Simon Myles, Hong Kong v Gibraltar, Bridgnorth, 1986)
Most runs in a career: 1173 (Maurice Odumbe, Kenya)
Best bowling in an innings: 7–9 (Asim Khan, Netherlands v East and Central Africa, Kuala Lumpur, 1997)
Most wickets in a career: 71 (Roland Lefebvre, Netherlands)
Most catches by an outfielder (career): 26 (Roland Lefebvre, Netherlands)
Most wicket-keeping dismissals (career): 38 (Allan Douglas, Bermuda)
Most ICC Trophy appearances: 43 (Roland Lefebvre)

See also
 ICC World Twenty20 Qualifier

References

 
World Cup Qualifier